Jarchi (also Romanized as Jārchī) is a village in Bonab Rural District, in the Central District of Zanjan County, Zanjan Province, Iran. At the 2006 census, its population was 39, in 7 families.

References 

Populated places in Zanjan County